My Wildest Dreams is the debut studio album by English singer-songwriter Claire Richards, released on 1 February 2019, through Sony Music Entertainment. The album was preceded by three singles; "On My Own", "End Before We Start", "Shame On You" and one promotional single, "Deep Waters".

Background and release
In July 2015, the singer released an acoustic version of "One for Sorrow". The acoustic version of the track was recorded for an event honouring Steps' producer Pete Waterman. The track was arranged and produced by Steve Anderson with whom Claire was working on her debut album. On 5 September 2015, Richards released a solo version of "Deeper Shade of Blue" which she announced via her Facebook page. On 1 January 2017, Richards once again reunited with Steps in a performance at G-A-Y on New Year's Eve to celebrate twenty years since their debut. On 6 March 2017, Steps confirmed that their fifth studio album, Tears on the Dancefloor, would be released on 21 April 2017 in the United Kingdom and be preceded by the lead single, "Scared of the Dark", on 10 March; they also announced the Party on the Dancefloor Tour, which took place in November and December 2017. The album debuted at number two on the UK Albums Chart missing out on the top spot to Ed Sheeran's ÷ . On 27 October 2017, a reissue of the album, Tears on the Dancefloor: Crying at the Disco was released and peaked at number eight in the United Kingdom. The group embarked on their Summer of Steps tour in 2018.

On 4 August 2018, Richards announced the release of her debut single "On My Own" and unveiled the album cover. The album was available to pre-order on 6 August 2018 as the standard edition, deluxe edition, a personal limited signed edition and a My Wildest Dreams Boxset which includes a CD, signed postcard set and candle and revealed the album to be released on 2 November 2018. On 13 August 2018, "My Wildest Dreams Tour" was announced. On 8 October 2018, Richards announced on her official Facebook page that the album was pushed back with a new release date. The album is available in a standard edition and a deluxe edition that features three extra tracks.

Singles
"On My Own" was released as the album's lead single on 6 August 2018. The music video was released on 10 August 2018. An acoustic version of the song was released on 24 August 2018 and a remix EP featuring six remixes was released 31 August 2018 to promote the single further.

"End Before We Start" was released as the album's second single on 21 September 2018. The music video was released on 1 October 2018. A remix EP featuring two remixes was released on 5 October 2018.

The third single "My Heart Is Heading Home (This Christmas)" was released alongside a remix EP on 23 November 2018. It peaked on the UK iTunes chart at number 68.

The fourth single from the album "Shame On You" was released alongside the video for the song on 6 January 2019.

Other songs
"Deep Waters" was released as an instant gratification track on 7 September 2018.

Track listing

Notes
  signifies a vocal producer

Charts

Release history

References

2019 debut albums
Albums produced by Cutfather
Albums produced by Ash Howes
Albums produced by Richard Stannard (songwriter)
Pop albums by English artists